The superficial epigastric artery (not to be confused with the superior epigastric artery) arises from the front of the femoral artery about 1 cm below the inguinal ligament, and, passing through the femoral sheath and the fascia cribrosa, turns upward in front of the inguinal ligament, and ascends between the two layers of the superficial fascia of the abdominal wall nearly as far as the umbilicus.

It distributes branches to the superficial subinguinal lymph glands, the superficial fascia, and the integument; it anastomoses with branches of the inferior epigastric, and with its fellow of the opposite side.

Additional images

References

Arteries of the abdomen
Arteries of the lower limb